The 2014 Al-Safira offensive, code-named "Zaeir al Ahrar” ("The Freemen Roar"), was a short-lived operation launched by Syrian rebels during the Syrian civil war in Aleppo Governorate, in an attempt to attack "three sites of the army which are al-Adnaneyyi, al-Zeraa al-Foqaneyyi and al-Ezraa al-Tahtatnia in order to open a road to attack the Defense Factories where helicopters take off in order to drop barrel bombs onto Aleppo, Idlib and Hama". The defense factories produced the barrel bombs that are dropped onto the city of Aleppo and its countryside.

Rebel offensive
On 8 October, the rebel Ahrar ash-Sham announced the start of a battle called "Zaeir al Ahrar". That day, rebels of this group captured the villages of Qashotah, al Barzaneyyi, Diman, al Zera’ah al Tehtaneyyi and al Zera’ah al Foqaneyyi near the Defense Factories. At least 14 soldiers and 5 rebels were killed, while two helicopters were downed while trying to take off from the Defense Factories.

On 9 October, Army claimed to have conducted a counterattack on rebel forces in Al-Barzaaniyya, Al-Zara’a, Bashkawi, Banaan Al-Hass, Kafr Akkar, and Al-‘Adnaniyya, resulting in the recapture of several of these villages. The Army also claimed that the rebels had refocused their offensive to the Khanasser countryside.

On 10 October, rebels captured the village of Abotbeh, leading to the death of 9 soldiers and losses among the rebels. This village is close to the town of Tal Abour, 2 km away from the Defense Factories. Rebels also captured the village of Sad’ayya overnight, before it was recaptured later that day.

Army counter-attack
On 12 October, the Army launched a counter-attack and regained control over the villages that were captured by the rebels since 8 October.

References

Al-Safira
Al-Safira
Military operations of the Syrian civil war involving the Syrian government
October 2014 events in Syria
As-Safira District